Jane West may refer to:

 Jane West (1758–1852)
 Jane West (campaigner), born 1976